Nurmsi may refer to several places in Estonia:

Nurmsi, Järva County, village in Paide Parish, Järva County
Nurmsi Airfield, in Nurmsi, Paide Parish
Nurmsi, Lääne County, village in Hanila Parish, Lääne County